Stephen P. Kilcar was a Scottish professional footballer who played as an inside forward. He played for several teams in the Football League during the 1930s, including Coventry City.

References

Scottish footballers
Association football inside forwards
East Stirlingshire F.C. players
Stenhousemuir F.C. players
Bradford (Park Avenue) A.F.C. players
Coventry City F.C. players
Mansfield Town F.C. players
Chester City F.C. players
Burnley F.C. players
AFC Bournemouth players
Watford F.C. players
Scottish Junior Football Association players
Scottish Football League players
English Football League players
Year of birth missing
Year of death missing
Linlithgow Rose F.C. players
People from Bo'ness
Footballers from Falkirk (council area)